Oncogenesis is a peer-reviewed open access medical journal covering the molecular biology of cancer. It was established in 2012 by Douglas R. Green as a sister journal to Oncogene, of which Green was then editor-in-chief. New articles are published exclusively online by Nature Publishing Group on a weekly basis. The editor-in-chief is Jan Paul Medema (University of Amsterdam). According to the Journal Citation Reports, the journal has a 2020 impact factor of 7.485, ranking it 40th out of 242 journals in the category "Oncology".

References

External links 

Nature Research academic journals
Oncology journals
Molecular and cellular biology journals
Online-only journals
Weekly journals
English-language journals
Publications established in 2012
Open access journals